Kassim Majaliwa Majaliwa (born 22 December 1960) is a Tanzanian politician who has been Prime Minister of Tanzania since 2015. He was appointed by President John Magufuli after the 2015 general election. He is a member of the ruling Chama Cha Mapinduzi party and has been a Member of Parliament for Ruangwa   Mimi enock Elias John naomba musanda wa kunifazili nikuzekimbaji chagu nichojaliwa na mugu ninakipaji Cha kuchezampira Niko mukoa wa mwanza

Early life and education
Majaliwa was born into a Muslim family on December 22, 1961 in Mnacho village, Ruangwa District of Lindi Region. He completed his schooling from Kigonsera Secondary School in 1983. He then worked as teacher for sixteen years until 1999. Meanwhile, he obtained a teaching diploma from Mtwara Teacher Training College in 1993 and a Bachelor of Education from the University of Dar es Salaam in 1998. He then joined the trade union movement and served as district secretary and regional secretary in the Tanzania Teachers' Association between 1999 and 2006. He was tapped to become the district commissioner for Urambo district in 2006. He remained in this role until his election to Parliament in 2010.

Political career
Majaliwa was first elected to Parliament in the 2010 general election on the Chama Cha Mapinduzi ticket from Ruangwa. He was Deputy Minister of State in the Prime Minister's Office for Regional Administration and Local Government from 2010 to 2015.

In the 2015 general election, Majaliwa was reelected from Ruangwa, defeating Omari Makota of the Civic United Front by a margin of 31,281 to 25,536 votes.

After John Magufuli was sworn in as President of Tanzania following the 2015 general election, he appointed Majaliwa as Prime Minister on 19 November 2015. His appointment was a surprise, even to himself, given he was a relative newcomer to electoral politics. His selection was attributed to his humility, honesty, work ethic as well as regional considerations - the new Prime Minister was expected to be from the southern part of the country, where Majaliwa is from. His experience in education as a teacher, trade unionist and deputy minister was also expected to be an asset in President Magufuli's stated desire to reform the sector. The opposition criticized his selection, citing his lack of experience.

References

1961 births
Living people
Prime Ministers of Tanzania
Chama Cha Mapinduzi MPs
Tanzanian MPs 2010–2015
Tanzanian MPs 2015–2020
Tanzanian MPs 2020–2025
Deputy government ministers of Tanzania
Kigonsera Secondary School alumni
University of Dar es Salaam alumni
Tanzanian schoolteachers
Tanzanian Muslims